Suomussalmi is a municipality in Finland and is located in the Kainuu region about  northeast of Kajaani, the capital of Kainuu and  south of Kuusamo. The municipality has a population of 
The municipality is unilingually Finnish. Ämmänsaari is the biggest built-up area in the municipality.

Suomussalmi is the second southernmost part of the reindeer-herding area in Finland.

During the Winter War of 1939–40, several battles were fought in the area around Suomussalmi, the most important ones being the Battle of Suomussalmi and the Battle of Raate. In these battles Finnish forces defeated numerically superior Soviet forces.

Formula One racing driver Heikki Kovalainen is from Suomussalmi, as well as the author Ilmari Kianto and the composer Osmo Tapio Räihälä, in addition to the ice hockey player, Janne Pesonen. Also, the first President of the Republic of Finland, K. J. Ståhlberg, was born in the Karhula rectory (Karhulan pappila) in Suomussalmi.

Suomussalmi hosted the 2016 World Berry Picking Championship.

Villages

 Alajärvi
 Ala-Vuokki
 Hossa
 Jumaliskylä
 Juntusranta
 Kaljuskylä
 Kerälä
 Kiannanniemi
 Korpela
 Korvua
 Kuivajärvi
 Kurimo
 Lomakylä
 Myllylahti
 Näljänkä
 Näätälä
 Peranka
 Pesiökylä
 Pesiönlahti
 Piispajärvi
 Pisto
 Pitämä
 Pyhäkylä
 Raate
 Ruhtinansalmi
 Sakara
 Selkoskylä
 Siikaranta
 Suomussalmi (Kirkonkylä)
 Tervakangas
 Vaaranniva
 Vasara
 Vuokki
 Yli-Vuokki
 Ämmänsaari (administrative center)

Kuivajärvi and Hietajärvi, located close to the Russian border, have long belonged to the poetic villages of White Karelia, and the Karelian language, Viena Karelian, has traditionally been spoken in the area.

Transport
Highway 5 (E63) comes from Hyrynsalmi via Suomussalmi to Kuusamo. The rest of the municipality's most important roads are mainly smaller regional roads; regional road 912 from Kuhmo comes to Suomussalmi, regional road 843 from Palovaara to Suomussalmi continues to Kuusamo's Poussuu, regional road 892 runs from Suomussalmi through Korpikylä and Kytömäki to Hyrynsalmi, regional road 897 takes you from Alajärvi from Suomussalmi via Hattuvaara to Yli-Näljänkä, and connecting road 9125 or Raatteentie (also included parts of the current regional road 912) is a connecting road from Raatteenportti to Raate in the municipality of Suomussalmi, which was named after the Battle of Raate in 1940.

Politics
Results of the 2011 Finnish parliamentary election in Suomussalmi:

Left Alliance   36.3%
Centre Party   30.9%
Finns Party   20.5%
National Coalition Party   5.2%
Social Democratic Party   3.1%
Christian Democrats   2.3%
Green League   0.9%
Other parties   0.8%

Notable people

 K. J. Ståhlberg (1865–1952)
 Hannes Tauriainen (1909–1971)
 Alho Alhoniemi (born 1933)
 Toini Gustafsson (born 1938)
 Matti Makkonen (1952–2015)
 Osmo Tapio Räihälä (born 1964)
 Tero Penttilä (born 1975)
 Merja Kyllönen (born 1977)
 Heikki Kovalainen (born 1981)
 Janne Pesonen (born 1982)

International relations

Twin towns — Sister cities
Suomussalmi is twinned with:

  Kalevala, Russia  
  Nordmaling Municipality, Sweden

References

External links 

 Municipality of Suomussalmi – Official website

 
Municipalities of Kainuu
Populated places established in 1867